Songs in the Key of Animals is the second studio album by American musician Benji Hughes. It was released in 2016 under Merge Records.

Critical reception
Relix called the album "12 deliciously weird, lo-fi keyboard pop tunes, with Hughes’ restrained vocals occasionally adorned by soulful backup vocals or muted horns." PopMatters wrote that "Hughes’ vast spectrum of music knowledge is showcased all over this sound safari."

Track listing

An older version of the album with a different track order, minor differences to track intros/outros and one additional song was released in 2014 simultaneously with the albums XXOXOXX and OXOXOXOXOX as a 4 disc set.

Original track listing

References

2016 albums
Merge Records albums
Benji Hughes albums